The Swan Lake Wildlife Area is a  tract of protected land located in Columbia County, Wisconsin, managed by the Wisconsin Department of Natural Resources (WDNR). Land to be used for the wildlife area was first acquired in 1963 to provide for hunting and other outdoor recreational activities in the county. In addition to outdoor recreation activities, the wildlife area was established to protect the Fox River watershed.

Swan Lake
The Lake is made up of 55% muck, 30% sand and 15% gravel. There is a single boat jetty that provides boating access to the Lake.

There are five different invasive species present in the Lake; the curly-leaf pondweed, eurasian water-milfoil, Japanese knotweed, purple loosestrife and zebra mussel. In addition to these invasive plants and animals, while not invasive, the Lake and surrounding Wildlife Area are dominated by large swathes of cattail marshes.

There are ten different types of cover in the wildlife area, including aspen, bottomland hardwood, developed, grassland, marsh, oak, shrub wetland, tamarack, upland conifer and the most common, Emergent Wetland.

Flora and fauna
There are several different types of trees residing in the wildlife area, the most prominent being oak, maple, hemlock, and red pine. In addition to the varied flora, in both Swan Lake and the surrounding marshland, musky, Northern pike, largemouth bass, walleye and northern pike are commonly found. Besides sea dwelling fauna, black tern, turkey and shorebirds have been known to frequent the area.

Other flora besides trees include bur-reed, common reed grass, various bulrush, pickerel-weed and wild rice.

See also
 Porcupine Lake Wilderness

References

External Links
 U.S. Geological Survey Map at the U.S. Geological Survey Map Website. Retrieved March 7th, 2022.

State Wildlife Area
Protected areas of Wisconsin
Geography of Columbia County, Wisconsin
Protected areas established in 1963